Del Mar College (DMC) is a public community college in Corpus Christi, Texas. Founded in 1935, DMC encompasses two primary campuses and one campus annex with combined physical assets of more than $99 million.

As defined by the Texas Legislature, the official service area of DMC is  the following:
all of Aransas, Kenedy, Nueces, and San Patricio counties,
the Calallen, Corpus Christi, Flour Bluff, Tuloso-Midway, and West Oso school districts, and any area located outside those districts that is within the municipality of Corpus Christi, and
the Riviera Independent School District.

Academics
Accredited by the Southern Association of Colleges and Schools, DMC offers Associate in Arts and Associate in Science degrees in over 50 university transfer majors and Associate in Applied Science degrees, Enhanced Skills Certificates and Certificates of Achievement in more than 80 occupational fields. During spring 2005, the Texas Higher Education Coordinating Board visited the college and rated 14 programs as exemplary—a record for an institution of Del Mar College's size.

Students can take courses using special scheduling options that include weekend, online, videoconferencing, and short-semester courses and Rapid Track, an accelerated program that allows students to complete an Associate in Arts degree in one year.

Additionally, 92% of tenure-track faculty hold a master's degree or higher with 22% holding a doctoral or first professional degree. The student/faculty ratio at DMC is 18:1.

A $108 million public bond package has allowed extensive renovation and expansion of Del Mar College East and West, along with the development of the DMC Annex that houses the Center for Economic Development. Both noncredit and credit students have access to classes, laboratories and the latest technology that upgrade their current skills, prepare them for further study or train them for immediate employment in the Coastal Bend area.

Del Mar College's Nursing Program has one of the largest nursing clinical simulation labs in the nation, including over 30 patient mannequins with programmable vital signs, EKG monitoring, and voice entry. The program is accredited by the Accreditation Commission for Education in Nursing (ACEN). During a period from 2009 to 2011, the passing rate of students taking the National Council Licensure Examination-Registered Nurse (NCLEX-RN) for the first time fell below 80 percent, and the program was placed on "conditional approval status" by the accreditation commission. The program strengthened admission criteria and temporarily closed admitting new students to the Registered Nurse Education program until the examination pass rate for current students increased to above 80 percent. The program produced a passing rate of 96% for 2012 and 90% for 2013.

In 2019, RN Careers included Del Mar College in their annual rankings of nursing programs.

Program accreditation

Surgical Technology
The Surgical Technology program operates under the standards of the Accreditation Review Committee on Education in Surgical Technology (ARC-ST). It is recognized by the Commission on Accreditation of Allied Health Education Programs (CAAHEP). Graduates of this program are entitled to a Certificate of Achievement and are eligible to sit for the national certification examination. Those students passing the examination become Certified Surgical Technologists (CST).

Registered Respiratory Therapist
The Two Year Therapist Program offers an Associate in Science Degree and starts in the fall each year.  Accredited by the National Board for Respiratory Care and the Commission on Accreditation for Respiratory Care.

Licensed Paramedic
The curricula of the Emergency Medical Services Professions program at Del Mar College is based on the National Standard Curriculum developed by the National Highway Transportation Safety Administration—Department of Transportation in accordance with all rules promulgated by the Texas Department of State Health Services.

Notable alumni
 Henry Cuesta (December 23, 1931 – December 17, 2003), was an American-born musician who was best known as a featured musician with The Lawrence Welk Show. His primary instrument was the clarinet and his technical mastery of the instrument was often compared to that of Benny Goodman.
 Pepe Serna (July 23, 1943) American actor, most notable roles were in Scarface and Car Wash.
 Raul Torres, state representative from Nueces County since 2011.

References

External links

Two-year colleges in the United States
Education in Corpus Christi, Texas
Educational institutions established in 1935
Universities and colleges accredited by the Southern Association of Colleges and Schools
Community colleges in Texas
1935 establishments in Texas